J. Dale Wainwright (born June 19, 1961 in Mt. Juliet, Tennessee) is a former associate justice of the Texas Supreme Court, now in private practice with Greenberg Traurig, LLP in Austin, Texas.

Wainwright was initially elected to a six-year term, in November 2002, to replace Deborah Hankinson. In 2008, he was re-elected to a second term that would have ended in December 2014.

On September 30, 2012, Wainwright officially resigned from the Texas Supreme Court after nearly a decade of service. He subsequently joined the Austin office of the law firm Bracewell and Giuliani. His successor on the court, effective December 3, 2012, was Jeffrey S. Boyd, a former chief of staff of then Texas Governor Rick Perry. Boyd was appointed by Perry to serve for the remainder of Wainwright's term.

Early education and career
Wainwright graduated summa cum laude with a major in economics from Howard University, studied at the London School of Economics as a Luard Scholar during his junior year, and received his J.D. from the University of Chicago Law School in 1988.

In 1999 Wainwright was appointed by then Texas Governor George W. Bush to the 334th District Court in Harris County, where he served until his election to the supreme court.

Elections

2002 election 
Wainwright and Wallace B. Jefferson were the first African Americans to be elected to the Texas Supreme Court. Jefferson was initially appointed by Perry in 2001, and won his seat in 2002, in the same election in which Wainwright was elected to an open seat on the court. Like all justices on the state supreme court, Wainwright was a Republican.

2008 election 
In 2008, Wainwright sought his first reelection to the court.  His main opponent was Democratic lawyer Sam Houston. Wainwright was reelected to a new six-year term with 51 percent of the vote to Houston's 45 percent. Libertarian candidate David G. Smith received 3 percent.

Personal life 
Wainwright and his wife, Debbie, have three sons, Jeremy, Phillip, and Joshua Wainwright.

See also
 Black conservatism in the United States

References

External links 
2008 Campaign Site
Profile of Justice Wainwright at the Texas Supreme Court website
"New Texas Supreme Court Justice began aspirations in Mt. Juliet," The Tennessean, May 29, 2003.

1961 births
Living people
People from Mount Juliet, Tennessee
African-American lawyers
African-American judges
Howard University alumni
People from Austin, Texas
People from Houston
Texas Republicans
Texas state court judges
Justices of the Texas Supreme Court
University of Chicago Law School alumni
21st-century American judges
21st-century American lawyers
21st-century African-American people
20th-century African-American people